The cinnamon bittern (Ixobrychus cinnamomeus) or chestnut bittern is a small Old World bittern, breeding in tropical and subtropical Asia from India east to China and Indonesia. It is mainly resident, but some northern birds migrate short distances.

Taxonomy
The cinnamon bittern was formally described in 1789 by the German naturalist Johann Friedrich Gmelin in his revised and expanded edition of Carl Linnaeus's Systema Naturae. He placed it with herons, cranes, egrets and bitterns in the genus Ardea and coined the binomial name Ardea cinnamomea. Gmelin based his description on the "Chinese heron" that had been included by the English ornithologist John Latham in his multi-volume A General Synopsis of Birds. Latham had based his own description on a partial specimen in the British Museum. The cinnamon bittern is now placed with nine other species in the genus Ixobrychus that was introduced in 1828 by the Swedish naturalist Gustaf Johan Billberg. The genus name combines the Ancient Greek ixias, a reed-like plant and brukhomai, to bellow. The specific epithet cinnamomeus is Latin meaning "cinnamon coloured". The species is monotypic: no subspecies are recognised.

Description

It is a small species at  length, though it is one of the larger Ixobrychus bitterns. Possessing a short neck and longish bill, the male is uniformly cinnamon above and buff below. The female is similar but her back and crown are brown, and the juvenile is like the female but heavily streaked brown below. When surprised on its nest or concerned, it assumes the characteristic attitude of bitterns, termed the on-guard. The neck is stretched perpendicularly, bill pointing skyward, while the bird freezes and becomes very hard to see among the surrounding reeds.

Distribution and habitat

The species has an extremely large range throughout Asia; there are breeding populations from India to Indonesia. Vagrants have been in Micronesia, the Seychelles and Afghanistan, among other locations. Global population estimates are uncertain and range from 130,000 to 2,000,000 individuals.

Behaviour and ecology
The cinnamon bittern breeds in reed beds, nesting on platforms of reeds in shrubs. Four to six eggs are laid. The species can be difficult to see, given their skulking lifestyle and reed bed habitat, but tend to emerge at dusk, when they can be seen creeping almost cat-like in search of frogs. Cinnamon bitterns feed on insects, fish and amphibians.

References

cinnamon bittern
cinnamon bittern
Birds of East Asia
Birds of South Asia
Birds of Southeast Asia
cinnamon bittern
cinnamon bittern
Birds of Nepal